Gălăşeni may refer to:

 Gălăşeni, a village in Măgești Commune, Bihor County, Romania
 Gălăşeni, a village in Cuzăplac Commune, Sălaj County, Romania
 Gălăşeni, Rîşcani, a commune in Raionul Rîşcani, Moldova